Lady Russell may refer to:

People
 Female consorts and children of Lord Russell (disambiguation)
 Elizabeth Cooke, Lady Russell (1528–1609) member of Gloriana's court, wife of the heir of the Earldom of Bedford
 Rachel Russell, Lady Russell (1636–1723) wife of Lord Russell of the Monmouth Rebellion
 Gentlewomen and aristocrats with the surname Russell (surname)

Fictional characters
 Lady Russell, a character from the 1817 Jane Austen novel  Persuasion (novel)

See also
 Russell (disambiguation)